Bad Kissingen station is a railway station in the spa town of Bad Kissingen, located in the Bad Kissingen district in Lower Franconia, Bavaria, Germany.

References

Railway stations in Bavaria
Railway stations in Germany opened in 1874
1874 establishments in Bavaria
Buildings and structures in Bad Kissingen (district)